is a passenger railway station located in the city of Nantan, Kyoto Prefecture, Japan, operated by West Japan Railway Company (JR West).

Lines

Station layout
The station consists of two opposed side platforms connected by a footbridge. The station is unattended.

Platforms

History
Yoshitomi Station opened on 20 July 1935. With the privatization of the Japan National Railways (JNR) on 1 April 1987, the station came under the aegis of the West Japan Railway Company.

Station numbering was introduced in March 2018 with Yoshitomi being assigned station number JR-E15.

Passenger statistics
In fiscal 2018, the station was used by an average of 500 passengers daily.

Surrounding area
 Japan National Route 9

See also
List of railway stations in Japan

References

External links

 Station Official Site

Railway stations in Kyoto Prefecture
Sanin Main Line
Railway stations in Japan opened in 1935
Nantan, Kyoto